The Sing-a-ma-jigs are an American line of electronic, singing stuffed toys released by Mattel in 2010.

Product description

Each Sing-a-ma-jig is battery-powered, with two AAA batteries already included. They are soft, plush dolls with terrycloth mouths, and measure about 12 inches in length.

The dolls make a variety of different noises when squeezed. Each "squeeze" causes the Sing-a-ma-jig to open its mouth to emit noise. The doll's mouth contains a set of plastic teeth that click together when closing. A Sing-a-ma-jig's noises include songs, "jibber-jabber" made up of vowel sounds, different notes on the octave scale, a greeting, and occasionally a goodbye. They each sing a different public-domain song unique to their model. The voice that each one has is unique to its model as well.

Types

Basic
As of late 2019, there are 22 "basic" Sing-a-ma-jig models: Italicised colors are the ones that have the "Voice Wiggle Effect", although the Aqua and Rose ones were later released as standard versions without that effect. The New Yellow Sing-a-ma-jig is the only one that sung three songs in the US, Japanese, and Korean markets.

Seasonal
In late November 2010, the first holiday-themed Sing-a-ma-jig was introduced for Christmas and sold at Toys "R" Us stores. "Santa" is a dark green doll with a white beard, and a red-and-white Santa Claus jacket and cap. He sings "Jingle Bells".

The second holiday-themed doll was released in February 2011 in time for Valentine's Day. This doll is red with a pink shirt featuring red hearts. Its ears are unique in that they are also shaped like hearts, breaking away from the bear, dog, elephant and rabbit ears used up until now. This doll sings "Let Me Call You Sweetheart" in her alto voice.

In March 2011, the third holiday-themed doll was released for Easter. This Sing-a-ma-jig is a white Easter rabbit with more detailed bunny ears. It sings "Here Comes Peter Cottontail", and rather than saying "Goodbye" or "See you later", signs off by saying, "Happy Easter!"  His shirt is covered in a colorful Easter Egg pattern. He has a baritone vocal range.

A 4th of July themed doll was released in time for the holiday in 2011. The doll is red, white and blue, and sings "The Star-Spangled Banner" (the American national anthem). Instead of "Hello!" or "How do you do?", he signs on by saying "Happy Independence Day!" He has a tenor vocal range.

Four Halloween themed dolls were released in October 2011. These Sing-a-ma-jigs included a pumpkin, a ghost, a skeleton, and a witch. All of them sing Trick or Treat and the ghost, skeleton and witch were Target exclusives, whereas the pumpkin was not exclusive. For the way they sign off, the pumpkin and ghost sign off by saying "Happy Halloween!", the skeleton says "Scare You Later' and the Witch says "See you later". Also, for the way they sign on, the pumpkin and ghost say "Trick or Treat" and the skeleton and witch say "Happy Halloween" in their tenor, bass and soprano voices.

In November 2011, two new Christmas themed Sing-a-ma-jigs were released. They included a snowman and a reindeer. The snowman sings Jingle Bells and the reindeer sings "We Wish You a Merry Christmas" in their alto voices.

Special Edition
There are two Birthday Sing-a-ma-jigs: the pink "Birthday Soprano" and the blue "Birthday Tenor". Each sings "Happy Birthday to You" in different pitches in addition to chattering and harmonizing with other Sing-a-ma-jig characters, and rather than saying "Goodbye" or "See you later", The birthday tenor signs off by saying, "Can I have cake too?" and the birthday soprano signs off by saying, "Bye Bye, Birthday!".

There are also Mickey Mouse and Minnie Mouse Sing-a-ma-jigs. Mickey and Minnie each sing a favorite Disney tune. Mickey sings the Mickey Mouse Clubhouse theme song and Minnie sings the Hot Dog Dance.

The Hits! 
There are 3 Sing-a-ma-jigs of a series part called "The Hits!". These were only sold in the UK, Japan, and Korea, and they all have the Voice Wiggle Effect.

Kohl's Exclusives 
3 more dolls were part released in 2011 as Kohl's Exclusives.

Duets
Sing-a-ma-jigs "Duets" consist of one larger character holding another smaller character. With one press of the belly, they simultaneously open their mouths to sing, harmonize, and chatter together.

Colors include:

Sing-a-ma-lings

In 2016, toy company Funrise revived the Sing-a-ma-jigs as the "Sing-a-ma-lings". The first six Sing-a-ma-lings are Sawyer, Darcy, Noodle, Blush, Bo, and Frankie.

A year later, Sing-a-ma-lings Pets came out. The toys have a pill shaped body with small feet, you activate it by squeezing the body, the mouth works the same as the Sing-a-ma-lings.

There are 4 of them to collect:
Bonsai: Blue Monkey with pink hair
Bugle: Purple Dog 
Bunaroo: Pink Bunny with a flower on its ear
Butter: Yellow Cat with pink hair and a bow

References

External links
 Official Website (archive from March 24, 2014)

Mattel
2010s toys
Electronic toys
Stuffed toys
Products introduced in 2010
Products and services discontinued in 2011